Erigeron compactus is a species of flowering plant in the family Asteraceae known by the common names cushion daisy, fernleaf fleabane, and compact daisy.

Distribution
Erigeron compactus is native to the woodlands and slopes of the western United States. It has been found in Nevada, western Utah, and eastern California (El Dorado, Mono, Inyo, San Bernardino Counties, and extreme eastern Fresno County).

Description
Erigeron compactus is a small perennial herb rarely reaching a maximum height of 10 centimeters (4 inches). It grows in fuzzy patches and clumps of fleshy leaves, each no more than 2.5 centimeters (1 inche) long and somewhat rounded in cross-section. It erects short, hairy stems each holding a single flower head about a centimeter (0.4 inches) wide. The head has a yellow center of disc florets surrounded by white, pink, or bicolored (white with lilac stripe) ray florets.

References

External links
NatureServe Explorer
The Jepson eFlora 2013
United States Department of Agriculture plants profile
CalPhotos photo gallery, University of California

compactus
Flora of California
Flora of the Great Basin
Plants described in 1917